Deportivo Chiantla is a Guatemalan football club from Chiantla, Huehuetenango Department. It was founded on 1980. It currently plays in the Primera División de Ascenso, the second tier of Guatemalan football.

History
The team began playing at amateur leagues having a great progress gaining more supporters and sponsors. In 1992 it achieved the professional status after being promoted to Liga mayor B today known as the second tier Primera División de Ascenso. In the 2017/18 they gained promotion to the Liga Nacional de Fútbol de Guatemala for the first time ever.

Current squad

List of coaches
  Elvis Tello Alvarado (2010)
  Julio César Englenton Chuga (Dec 2015 - )
  Marvin Hernández (Aug 2017 - August 2018)	
  Alberto Salguero (Sept 2018-)

References
Fedefut Guatemala
Soccerway profile

Huehuetenango Department
Football clubs in Guatemala
Association football clubs established in 1980
1980 establishments in Guatemala